Pavel Animisov (born April 19, 1986 in Leningrad, Russia) is a Russian chess Grandmaster (2019). His highest rating was 2541 (in July 2012). His current rating is 2527 (May 2020).

Champion of Russia among under 14 years old (2000). Olympic champion in the Russian national children team (2000). He took 1-4 place in the championship of Russia up to 16 years (2001).

He received the International master title in 2005.

References

1986 births
Russian chess players
Chess grandmasters
Living people